This is a list of programs previously aired by Light TV. For the current shows of this network, see List of programs broadcast by Light TV.

Previous programming

Original programming
 Adyenda (2005–2017)
 The Awesome Life (2019–2020)
 Bless Pilipinas (2019-2022)
 Buhay Unleash (2016–2017)
 Business Zone w/ Cherry Moriones-Doromal
 Crossroads
 Daily Service Show (1998-2000)
 Hamon ng Kasaysayan
 Hashtag Pinoy (2015–2019)
 I Love Pinas (2011–2017)
 JAM (2015–2018)
 Jesus the Healer: Healing Crusade (2018-2020)
 Kids HQ (2016–2018)
 Legal Forum (2004–2018)
 Life Giver (2012–2022)
 Light Up (2011–2022)
 Midnight Prayer Helps (2006–2020)
 OrganiqueTV (2015–2017)
 Pisobilities (2012–2019)
 PJM Forum (1998–2020)
 Road Trip Refueled (2012-2022)
 Serbisyong Legal (2004-2005)
 Shout Out: Sigaw ng Kabataan! (2016–2017)
 Solemn Sessions (2012–2018)
 Sarap Pinoy (2011–2017)
 This Is My Story, This Is My Song (2012–2018)
 Tiny Kitchen (2014–2018)

Foreign/other TV networks
 The 700 Club International (Christian Broadcasting Network)
 Christian World News (CBN News)
 Edgemont (2002-2004, UniversiTV from 2006-2008)
 Mariú (2002-2003)
 Praise the Lord (TBN)
 This New Life (in cooperation with Alabang New Life Christian Center) (2002-2014)

Entertainment
Edge TV (2019-2020)
Ignite Gospel Music Festival (2012-2016)
UCAPehan (produced by United Christian Artists of the Philippines/UCAP) (2019)

Infomercials
 EZ Shop (2004-2005)
 Shop at Home (1998-2000)
 Value Vision (1998-2005, 2008-2009)
 Winner TV Shopping (2002-2005, 2008-2011)

Newscasts
 News Light (2011–2019)
 RadioVizion 33
 ZOE Balita Ngayon (1998-2005)
 ZOE News Round-up (1998-2005)
 ZTV NewsBreak

Other TV shows
 Ang Tugon w/ Pastor Greg Durante
 Arthur Manuntag's Timeless
 The BOSS w/ Rannie Raymundo
 The Buddy Zamora Musical Experience
 Buhay Pinoy - telemagazine lifestyle and tourism show
 Chito Alcid Talk Show
 ClassRoam
 Colby's Clubhouse
 CBA - Pilipinas (2019)
 Coney Reyes on Camera (2002-2003)
 Cross TV Music Videos
 Friends Again (2014)
 Gabay at Aksyon
 Gimme A Break
 God is at Work (2011-2012)
 Great Day to Live w/ Pastor Greg Durante
 Harvest w/ Greg Laurie
 Health is Wealth (2011-2012)
 Hearts on Fire
 Heartsongs
 Inter-Mission (2011-2012)
 iSHINE
 The International Curriculum
 Juan On Juan
 Judge Amy
 Kids Against Crime (2000-2002)
 Kids Club (2000-2002)
 Kids on the Move
 Lingkod Bayan with Tony Falcon (2011-2014)
 The Living Word
 Mr. Shooli's No Holds Barred
 New Generation
 One Cubed
 The Other Side
 Pilipinas Pinagpala Ka Hallelujah Talaga! (2011-2012)
 Postcards (2011-2012)
 Prayer for the Nation (2016-2017)
 The Power Team
 Praise Music Videos
 Psalty The Bible Show (2002-2005)
 Quigley's Village (2001-2005)
 Real Lives, Real People
 Siklista Ako TV (produced by Camerageek Media Productions made possible by Trinx Bikes) (2019-2020)
 The 700 Club Asia
 The Rock Of My Salvation (2003-2005)
 This Generation w/ Pastor Eastman Curtis
 Urban Nights
 Virtual Memory
 Word Up - teen oriented talk show
 WWJD TV
 Youth Bytes

Programming block
 CNBC on ZOE TV

Smile of a Child
 Dooley and Pals (2011)
 Grandfather Reads (2011)
 Pahappahooey Island (2014)
 Sarah's Stories (2011)
 Super Simple Science Stuff (2011)

Specials
 Bantay Boto 2022 (May 9, 2022)
 Jesus is Lord Church Anniversary Specials (1998-ongoing)
 Miss Tourism Philippines 2019 (2019, delayed telecast)
  Panata Sa Bayan 2022: The KBP Presidential Candidate (February 4, 2022)

Canned programs from various productions

Amazing Lifestyle
 The Fuse
 Morph TV

CBN Asia
 Superbook
 The Flying House

CCI Asia
 The Isla Hour
 Juice Block

UniversiTV
 Ano Ba U? (2006-2008)
 Channel Choice (2007-2008)
 Chop Suey (2006-2008)
 Future Finder (2006-2008)
 Hapinas (2007-2008)
 Indie Sikat (2006-2008)
 KNN: Kabataan News Network (2007-2008)
 Life Guide (2006-2008) (now airing on GCTV via Cignal Digital TV Channel 188)
 Mall Diva (2006-2008)
 One Prayer (2006-2008)
 Re-Porma (2006-2008)
 Sked Mo (2006-2008)
 U-Turn (2006-2008)

Notes
(*) Some programs are same as the references above

References

Light TV
ZOE Broadcasting Network